The 2021–22 Utah Runnin' Utes men's basketball team represented the University of Utah during the 2021–22 NCAA Division I men's basketball season. The team was led by first-year head coach Craig Smith. They played their home games at the Jon M. Huntsman Center in Salt Lake City, Utah as members of the Pac-12 Conference. The Utes finished the season 11–20, 4–16 in Pac-12 play to finish in 11th place. They lost in the first round of the Pac-12 tournament to Washington.

Previous season
In a season limited due to the ongoing COVID-19 pandemic, the Utes finished the 2020–21 season 12–13, 7–11 in Pac-12 play to finish in eighth place. They defeated Washington in the first round of the Pac-12 tournament before losing to USC in the quarterfinals. 

On March 16, 2021, head coach Larry Krystkowiak was fired after 10 seasons with an overall record of 183–139. The school named Craig Smith, from cross-state rival Utah State, the new head coach on March 27.

Offseason

Departures

Incoming transfers

Recruiting classes

2021 recruiting class

2022 recruiting class

Roster

Schedule and results 

|-
!colspan=12 style=|Exhibition
 
|-
!colspan=12 style=|Regular season
 

|-
!colspan=12 style=| Pac-12 tournament

Source:

References

2021–22 Pac-12 Conference men's basketball season
2020-21 team
Utah Utes
Utah Utes